Adoro is a German opera crossover music project that has had several hit albums for Universal.

Members
 Peter Dasch (bass-baritone)
 Nico Müller (baritone)
 Jandy Ganguly (baritone)
 Assaf Kacholi (lyric tenor)
 Laszlo Maleczky (tenor) - former fifth member

Discography

Albums

Singles
(Charting)

Songs
(in alphabetical order)

References

German musical groups
Opera crossover singers
Vocal quartets